SquirrelMail is a project that aims to provide both a web-based email client and a proxy server for the IMAP protocol.

The latest stable version 1.4.23-svn is tested with PHP up to version 8.1 and replaces version 1.4.22 which can only run on PHP version 5.0-5.4. The svn part in the version name points out that bugfixes and minor improvements are no longer published as new versions, but instead are maintained within Apache Subversion version control system.

History 
The webmail portion of the project was started by Nathan and Luke Ehresman in 1999 and is written in PHP. SquirrelMail can be employed in conjunction with a LAMP "stack", and any other operating systems that support PHP are supported as well. The web server needs access to the IMAP server hosting the email and to an SMTP server to be able to send mails.

SquirrelMail webmail outputs valid HTML 4.0 for its presentation, making it compatible with a majority of current web browsers. SquirrelMail webmail uses a plugin architecture to accommodate additional features around the core application, and over 200 plugins are available on the SquirrelMail website.

The SquirrelMail IMAP proxy server product was created in 2002 by Dave McMurtrie while at the University of Pittsburgh (where it was named "up-imapproxy", although it has become more commonly known as "imapproxy") and adopted by the SquirrelMail team in 2010. It is written in C and is primarily made to provide stateful connections for stateless webmail client software to an IMAP server, thus avoiding new IMAP logins for every client action and in some cases significantly improving webmail performance.

Both SquirrelMail products are free and open-source software subject to the terms of the GNU General Public License version 2 or any later version.

SquirrelMail webmail was included in the repositories of many major Linux distributions
and is independently downloaded by thousands of people every month.

Platforms
SquirrelMail webmail is available for any platform supporting PHP. Most commonly used platforms include Linux, FreeBSD, macOS and the server variants of Microsoft Windows. SquirrelMail IMAP Proxy compiles on most flavors of Unix, and can generally be used on the same platforms that the webmail product can with the exception of Microsoft Windows, unless used in a Cygwin or similar environment. Apple shipped SquirrelMail as their supported web mail solution in Mac OS X Server.

Plugins
The SquirrelMail webmail client itself is a complete webmail system, but extra features are available in the form of plugins. There are over 200 third-party plugins available for download from the SquirrelMail website and SquirrelMail ships with several "standard" or "core" plugins.

Internationalization
SquirrelMail webmail has been translated into over 50 languages including Arabic, Chinese, French, German, and Spanish.

Notable installations
SquirrelMail has been implemented as the official email system of the Prime Minister's Office of the Republic of India for its security advantages over Microsoft's Outlook Express.

In 2004 HEC Montréal business school deployed SquirrelMail as part of a comprehensive webmail solution, to support thousands of users.

See also

 Comparison of e-mail clients
 Internet Messaging Program
 Roundcube

References

External links
 

Email clients
Proxy server software for Linux
Free email software
Free software programmed in PHP
Free software webmail